National Alliance – Segni Pact was a short-lived electoral alliance between National Alliance and Segni Pact for the 1999 European election, headed by Gianfranco Fini. and Mario Segni The alliance's logo (an elephant) made reference to the US Republican Party.
The alliance, known informally as "the Elephant", won 10.30% of the vote and 9 seats.

Election results

European Parliament

References

Defunct political party alliances in Italy
1999 establishments in Italy